Eumitra nitens is an extinct species of sea snail, a marine gastropod mollusk, in the family Mitridae, the miters or miter snails.

Distribution
This species occurs in New Zealand.

References

nitens
Gastropods described in 1918